The Lord Chamberlain of Norway (Norwegian: hoffsjef) is a traditional officer of the Royal Household of Norway. The title was introduced in 1866. In Denmark the equivalent title is Hofmarskallen (the Court Marshal).

Lords Chamberlain of Norway
1815–1870: Herman Severin Løvenskiold

1890-1904: Theodor Christian Brun Frølich
1904–1925: Fritz Rustad
1926–1931: Jacob Roll Knagenhjelm
1931–1945: Peder Anker Wedel Jarlsberg
1945–1954: Peter Fredrik Broch
1955–1966: Ingvald Smith-Kielland
1966–1985: Odd Grønvold
1985–1991: Ingvald M. Smith-Kielland
1991–1993: Kaare Langlete
1993–1996: Sivert Farstad
1996–2004: Lars Petter Forberg
2004–2009: Rolf Trolle Andersen
2009–2015: Åge Bernhard Grutle
2015–2022: Gry Mølleskog
2022–present: Olav Heian-Engdal

References

See also
Chamberlain (office)
Norwegian order of precedence
Marshal
Court appointment

Norwegian monarchy
Court titles
1866 establishments in Norway

no:Hoffsjef